The Scorpius–Centaurus association (sometimes called Sco–Cen or Sco OB2) is the nearest OB association to the Sun. This stellar association is composed of three subgroups (Upper Scorpius, Upper Centaurus–Lupus, and Lower Centaurus–Crux) and its distance is about 130 parsecs or 420 light-years. Using improved Hipparcos data, Rizzuto and colleagues analysed nearby stars more closely, bringing the number of known members to 436. They doubt the need to add a subclassification because they found a more continuous spread of stars.

The Sco–Cen subgroups range in age from 11 million years (Upper Scorpius) to roughly 15 million years (Upper Centaurus–Lupus and Lower Centaurus–Crux). Many of the bright stars in the constellations Scorpius, Lupus, Centaurus, and Crux are members of the Sco–Cen association, including Antares (the most massive member of Upper Scorpius), and most of the stars in the Southern Cross. Hundreds of stars have been identified as members of Sco-Cen, with masses ranging from roughly 15 solar masses (Antares) down to below the hydrogen-burning limit (i.e. brown dwarfs), and the total stellar population in each of the three subgroups is probably of the order 1000–2000.
The Sco–Cen OB association appears to be the most pronounced part of a large complex of recent (<20 million years) and ongoing star-formation. The complex contains several star-forming molecular clouds in Sco–Cen's immediate vicinity—the Rho Oph, Pipe Nebula, Barnard 68, Chamaeleon, Lupus, Corona Australis, and Coalsack cloud complexes (all at distances of ~120-200 parsecs), and several less populous, young stellar groups on the periphery of Sco–Cen, including the ~3–5 million-year-old Epsilon Chamaeleontis group, ~7 million-year-old Eta Chamaeleontis moving group, ~8 million-year-old TW Hydrae association, ~12 million-year-old Beta Pictoris moving group, and possibly the ~30–50 million-year-old IC 2602 open cluster.

The stellar members of the Sco–Cen association have convergent proper motions of approximately 0.02–0.04 arcseconds per year, indicative that the stars have nearly parallel velocity vectors, moving at about 20 km/s with respect to the Sun. The dispersion of the velocities within the subgroups are only of order 1–2 km/s, and the group is most likely gravitationally unbound. Several supernovae have exploded in Sco–Cen over the past 15 million years, leaving a network of expanding gas superbubbles around the group, including the Loop I Bubble. 

To explain the presence of radioactive 60Fe in deep ocean ferromanganese crusts and in biogenic magnetite crystals within Pacific Ocean sediments it has been hypothesized that a nearby supernova, possibly a member of Sco–Cen, exploded in the Sun's vicinity roughly 3 million years ago, causing the Pliocene–Pleistocene boundary marine extinction. However, other findings cite the distance at which this supernova occurred at more than 100 parsec, maintaining that it is not likely not to have contributed to this extinction through the mechanism of what is known as the ultra-violet B (UV-B) catastrophe.
In 2019, researchers found interstellar iron in Antarctica which they relate to the Local Interstellar Cloud, which might have been formed near the Sco-Cen association.

In December 2021, around 70 new rogue planets were discovered in the Upper Scorpius association.

The subgroups of the Scorpius-Centaurus association contains the youngest transiting exoplanets: K2-33 b (11 Myrs), TOI-1227 b (11 Myrs) and HIP 67522 b (17 Myrs). It also contains directly imaged exoplanets such as UScoCTIO 108 b and the PDS 70 system.

See also 

 List of nearby stellar associations and moving groups
 β Pictoris moving group
 Ursa Major Moving Group

References

 
Stellar associations
Scorpius (constellation)
Centaurus (constellation)
Lupus (constellation)
Crux (constellation)